Heukelom is a village in the Dutch province of North Brabant, next to Oisterwijk and Berkel-Enschot.

Heukelom was home to 249 people in 1840. Heukelom used to be part of the municipality of Berkel-Enschot. In 1996, it became part of the municipality of Oisterwijk.

References 

Populated places in North Brabant
Oisterwijk